Princess Ashi Euphelma Choden Wangchuck (born 6 June 1993) is a princess of Bhutan. She is the daughter of the fourth King of Bhutan Jigme Singye Wangchuck and his wife, Queen Mother Ashi Sangay Choden Wangchuck. She is half-sister of the fifth King, Jigme Khesar Namgyel Wangchuck.

Biography 
Princess Euphelma Choden Wangchuck is the youngest daughter of the fourth King of Bhutan, currently King-Father of Bhutan. She has been educated in the exclusive Swiss boarding school, Institut Le Rosey, in Rolle (promotion of 2011). On 1 July 2011 she visited the Alhambra with her mother, Queen Ashi Sangay Choden Wangchuck. Later she studied Sociology at the Georgetown University in the United States, graduating in 2016. She attended the Opening Ceremony of the 2018 Asian Para Games on 6 October in the Indonesian capital city Jakarta (the first time Bhutan sent a delegation to the event).

Marriage and children 
On 29 October 2020, she married Dasho Thinley Norbu at Dechencholing Palace. He was born to Yab Dhondup Gyaltshen and Yum Sonam Choki in 1992, and is the younger brother of Her Majesty The Gyaltsuen, Ashi Jetsun Pema Wangchuck. After graduating from St. Stephen's College, Delhi in Delhi University, Dasho Thinley Norbu trained as a pilot (as his father) has been flying for the National Airline Druk Air since 2019.

Both Euphelma Choden and Thinley Norbu are active members of DeSuups, an organization made up of volunteers who go to the areas affected by some cataclysm or in charity events and who wear a familiar orange uniform to be easily recognizable. They are known as "Guardians of Peace".

Patronages 
 President of the Bhutan Paralympic Committee (BPC) since 2018.
 Chairman of the Gyalyum (Queen Mother) Charitable Trust.
 Patron of Red Dot Bhutan since 2021.

Titles and styles

 6 June 1993 – present: Her Royal Highness Princess Ashi Euphelma Choden Wangchuck.

See also
 House of Wangchuck
 Line of succession to the Bhutanese throne

References

|-

Bhutanese monarchy
Living people
1993 births
Wangchuck dynasty
Georgetown College (Georgetown University) alumni
Alumni of Institut Le Rosey